Neil Kinnock was Leader of the Labour Party and Leader of the Opposition from 2 October 1983 to 18 July 1992. He convincingly defeated Roy Hattersley, Eric Heffer, and Peter Shore in the 1983 leadership election, which was prompted by Michael Foot's resignation following the disastrous general election result earlier that year. Kinnock's period as Leader encompassed the bulk of the Thatcher premiership and the first two years of the Major premiership. Kinnock resigned in 1992 after losing his second election as Leader.

Shadow Cabinet

Initial Shadow Cabinet
Kinnock announced his first Shadow Cabinet on 31 October 1983.
Neil Kinnock – Leader of Her Majesty's Most Loyal Opposition and Leader of the Labour Party
Roy Hattersley – Deputy Leader of the Labour Party and Shadow Chancellor of the Exchequer
Denis Healey – Shadow Foreign Secretary
Gerald Kaufman – Shadow Home Secretary
John Silkin – Shadow Secretary of State for Defence
Peter Shore – Shadow Secretary of State for Trade and Industry and Shadow Leader of the House of Commons
Eric Heffer – Shadow Secretary of State for Housing and Construction and Labour Party Chairman
Michael Meacher – Shadow Secretary of State for Health and Social Services
Giles Radice – Shadow Secretary of State for Education
John Prescott – Shadow Secretary of State for Transport
John Smith – Shadow Secretary of State for Employment
Stanley Orme – Shadow Secretary of State for Energy
Bob Hughes – Shadow Minister of Agriculture, Fisheries and Food
Jack Cunningham – Shadow Secretary of State for the Environment
Donald Dewar – Shadow Secretary of State for Scotland
Barry Jones – Shadow Secretary of State for Wales
Peter Archer – Shadow Secretary of State for Northern Ireland
Robin Cook – Shadow Minister for Europe
Jo Richardson – Shadow Minister responsible for Women's Rights
John Morris – Shadow Attorney General and principal frontbench spokesman for Legal Affairs
The Lord Elwyn-Jones – Shadow Lord Chancellor
The Lord Cledwyn of Penrhos – Leader of the Opposition in the House of Lords
Michael Cocks – Opposition Chief Whip in the House of Commons
The Lord Ponsonby of Shulbrede – Opposition Chief Whip in the House of Lords

1984 reshuffle
On 26 October 1984, Kinnock reshuffled his team in the wake of the 1984 Shadow Cabinet elections. Peter Shore remained Shadow Leader of the House, but Trade and Industry was transferred to John Smith, who was replaced as Shadow Employment Secretary by John Prescott. Gwyneth Dunwoody took over as Shadow Transport Secretary, having previously sat in the Shadow Cabinet without portfolio. Denzil Davies replaced Silkin as Shadow Defence Secretary Eric Heffer's was dropped from the Shadow Cabinet, as, it appears, his portfolio was as well. Brynmor John replaced Hughes as Shadow Agriculture Minister.
Neil Kinnock – Leader of Her Majesty's Most Loyal Opposition and Leader of the Labour Party
Roy Hattersley – Deputy Leader of the Labour Party and Shadow Chancellor of the Exchequer
Denis Healey – Shadow Foreign Secretary
Gerald Kaufman – Shadow Home Secretary
Denzil Davies – Shadow Secretary of State for Defence
John Smith – Shadow Secretary of State for Trade and Industry
Peter Shore – Shadow Leader of the House of Commons
Michael Meacher – Shadow Secretary of State for Health and Social Services
Giles Radice – Shadow Secretary of State for Education
Gwyneth Dunwoody – Shadow Secretary of State for Transport
John Prescott – Shadow Secretary of State for Employment
Stanley Orme – Shadow Secretary of State for Energy
Brynmor John – Shadow Minister of Agriculture, Fisheries and Food
Jack Cunningham – Shadow Secretary of State for the Environment
Donald Dewar – Shadow Secretary of State for Scotland
Barry Jones – Shadow Secretary of State for Wales
Peter Archer – Shadow Secretary of State for Northern Ireland
Robin Cook – Shadow Minister for Europe and Campaign co-ordinator
Jo Richardson – Shadow Minister responsible for Women's Rights
John Morris – Shadow Attorney General and principal frontbench spokesman for Legal Affairs
The Lord Elwyn-Jones – Shadow Lord Chancellor
The Lord Cledwyn of Penrhos – Leader of the Opposition in the House of Lords
Michael Cocks – Opposition Chief Whip in the House of Commons
The Lord Ponsonby of Shulbrede – Opposition Chief Whip in the House of Lords

Changes
Entering the 1985/86 session of Parliament, Michael Cocks stepped down as Chief Whip, and Derek Foster, who had been Kinnock's Parliamentary Private Secretary, defeated the favourite, Norman Hogg, by one vote in the second round of the resulting election among Commons members of the Parliamentary Labour Party.
Gwyneth Dunwoody lost in the 1985 Shadow Cabinet elections and was replaced by Robert Hughes as Shadow Transport Secretary.
At the 1986 Shadow Cabinet elections, Bryan Gould and David Clark joined the shadow cabinet

1987 reshuffle
Kinnock reshuffled his Shadow Cabinet on 13 July 1987 in the aftermath of the general election loss. Denis Healey retired from the front bench and was replaced as Shadow Foreign Secretary by Kaufman, who was in turn replaced by Hattersley as Shadow Home Secretary. John Smith replaced the latter Shadow Chancellor. Bryan Gould replaced Smith as Shadow Trade and Industry Secretary, Alan Williams replaced Barry Jones as Shadow Welsh Secretary, and Kevin McNamara replaced Archer as Shadow Northern Ireland Secretary. Robin Cook replaced Meacher as Shadow Health Secretary, and Meacher took over Employment from Prescott, who in turn took the Energy portfolio, with Orme leaving Shadow Cabinet. Shore (Shadow Leader of the House), Radice (Shadow Education Secretary), and Brynmor John (Shadow Agriculture Minister) also left the front bench, being replaced by Frank Dobson, Jack Straw and David Clark, respectively. Gordon Brown was appointed Shadow Chief Secretary to the Treasury.
Neil Kinnock – Leader of Her Majesty's Most Loyal Opposition and Leader of the Labour Party
Roy Hattersley – Deputy Leader of the Labour Party and Shadow Home Secretary
Gerald Kaufman – Shadow Foreign Secretary
John Smith – Shadow Chancellor of the Exchequer
Denzil Davies – Shadow Secretary of State for Defence
Bryan Gould – Shadow Secretary of State for Trade and Industry
Frank Dobson – Shadow Leader of the House of Commons and Campaign co-ordinator
Robin Cook – Shadow Secretary of State for Health and Social Services
Michael Meacher – Shadow Secretary of State for Employment
Jack Straw – Shadow Secretary of State for Education
Robert Hughes – Shadow Secretary of State for Transport
John Prescott – Shadow Secretary of State for Energy
David Clark – Shadow Minister of Agriculture, Fisheries and Food
Jack Cunningham – Shadow Secretary of State for the Environment
Gordon Brown – Shadow Chief Secretary to the Treasury
Donald Dewar – Shadow Secretary of State for Scotland
Alan Williams – Shadow Secretary of State for Wales
Kevin McNamara – Shadow Secretary of State for Northern Ireland
Jo Richardson – Shadow Minister responsible for Women's Rights
John Morris – Shadow Attorney General and principal frontbench spokesman for Legal Affairs
The Lord Elwyn-Jones – Shadow Lord Chancellor
The Lord Cledwyn of Penrhos – Leader of the Opposition in the House of Lords
Derek Foster – Opposition Chief Whip in the House of Commons
The Lord Ponsonby of Shulbrede – Opposition Chief Whip in the House of Lords

Changes
On 14 June 1988, Martin O'Neill replaced Denzil Davies as Shadow Defence Secretary after the latter resigned in protest over inadequate consultation over a change in the party's defence policy.
Following the 1988 Shadow Cabinet elections in autumn, Tony Blair replaced Prescott at Energy, and Prescott returned to Transport. Hughes seems to have left the Shadow Cabinet.

1989 reshuffle
Following the 1989 Shadow Cabinet elections, Kinnock on 2 November reshuffled the Shadow Cabinet. Dobson replaced Blair as Shadow Energy Secretary. Joining the Shadow Cabinet, Tony Blair took Meacher's portfolio, Employment. Robin Cook's portfolio was divided in two after a Government reshuffle; he retained Health, but Meacher took Social Security. Cunningham took Shadow Leader of the House, being replaced by at Environment by Gould. Brown took the latter's Trade and Industry, being replaced himself by Margaret Beckett as Shadow Chief Secretary to the Treasury. Barry Jones returned to Wales portfolio, bumping Alan Williams from the front bench. Joan Lestor joined the Shadow Cabinet as Shadow Children's minister, and Ann Clwyd joined as Shadow Minister for International Development and Co-operation.
Neil Kinnock – Leader of Her Majesty's Most Loyal Opposition and Leader of the Labour Party
Roy Hattersley – Deputy Leader of the Labour Party and Shadow Home Secretary
Gerald Kaufman – Shadow Foreign Secretary
John Smith – Shadow Chancellor of the Exchequer
Martin O'Neill – Shadow Secretary of State for Defence
Gordon Brown – Shadow Secretary of State for Trade and Industry
Frank Dobson – Shadow Secretary of State for Energy
Jack Cunningham – Shadow Leader of the House of Commons and Campaign co-ordinator
Robin Cook – Shadow Secretary of State for Health
Michael Meacher – Shadow Secretary of State for Social Security
Tony Blair – Shadow Secretary of State for Employment
Jack Straw – Shadow Secretary of State for Education
John Prescott – Shadow Secretary of State for Transport
David Clark – Shadow Minister of Agriculture, Fisheries and Food
Bryan Gould – Shadow Secretary of State for the Environment
Margaret Beckett – Shadow Chief Secretary to the Treasury
Donald Dewar – Shadow Secretary of State for Scotland
Barry Jones – Shadow Secretary of State for Wales
Kevin McNamara – Shadow Secretary of State for Northern Ireland
Jo Richardson – Shadow Minister responsible for Women's Rights
Joan Lestor – Shadow Minister for Children
Ann Clwyd – Shadow Minister for International Development and co-operation
John Morris – Shadow Attorney General and principal frontbench spokesman for Legal Affairs
The Lord Elwyn-Jones – Shadow Lord Chancellor
The Lord Cledwyn of Penrhos – Leader of the Opposition in the House of Lords
Derek Foster – Opposition Chief Whip in the House of Commons
The Lord Ponsonby of Shulbrede – Opposition Chief Whip in the House of Lords

Changes
Lord Elwyn-Jones died on 4 December 1989, and he was replaced by Lord Mishcon.
Lord Ponsonby died on 13 June 1990; he was replaced by Lord Graham of Edmonton.

See also
Second Thatcher ministry
Third Thatcher ministry
First Major ministry
Shadow Cabinet of John Smith

References

Kinnock
Official Opposition (United Kingdom)
Neil Kinnock
1983 establishments in the United Kingdom
1992 disestablishments in the United Kingdom
British shadow cabinets